Ununseptium (Uus) is the former name of a chemical element now called Tennessine (Ts)

UUS may also refer to:

 Ullevål University Hospital, Oslo, Norway
 Yuzhno-Sakhalinsk Airport, Russia (IATA code)
 Investigation Bureau for Railway, Funicular and Boat Accidents (Unfalluntersuchungsstelle für Bahnen und Schiffe)